Babb (Blackfeet: , "Lakes Inside", or , “Cree Town”) is a small unincorporated farming and ranching community in Glacier County, Montana, United States, on the Blackfeet Indian Reservation. The community experiences a large influx of tourists in the summer months as it is the gateway to the Many Glacier area of Glacier National Park. Babb is a census-designated place (CDP) and had a population of 174 at the 2010 census.

Community infrastructure includes one school (Babb Elementary School), a U.S. Post Office, a fire station that houses the Babb/St. Mary Volunteer Fire Department, Thronson's General Store and Motel, several restaurants, two churches, and a gas station. Alcohol is not sold in Babb.

Nearby attractions include Glacier National Park, the Many Glacier Hotel, the St. Mary River, the St. Mary Irrigation Canal, Chief Mountain, and the U.S. ports of entry of Piegan and Chief Mountain.

Nearby attractions

Many Glacier
Many Glacier is an area within Glacier National Park that is accessed through Babb. It is located on the east side of the park, north of the Going-to-the-Sun Road. Lake Sherburne is the large lake in the area, and the Many Glacier Hotel, the largest hotel within the park, is along the shore of the adjacent Swiftcurrent Lake. The Many Glacier Hotel and surrounding buildings are a National Historic Landmark, with original construction dating back to 1915. Many Glacier is surrounded by the high peaks of the Lewis Range, and numerous hiking trails can be accessed from the area. The region is noted for numerous lakes, waterfalls, and dense coniferous forests interspersed with alpine meadows. Major sites in the immediate vicinity that can be accessed by trails include Lake Josephine, Grinnell Lake, the Grinnell Glacier, Cracker Lake, Granite Park Chalet, the Iceberg Cirque, and the Ptarmigan Tunnel, a hiking tunnel carved through the mountainside during the 1930s. Tour boats allow visitors an opportunity to venture onto Swiftcurrent Lake. Other activities in the region include ranger-guided nature hikes, horseback riding, fishing and camping

Many Glacier Hotel  was built in 1914. Today, the hotel still maintains its historic character, in part by not placing televisions in guest rooms. Most rooms either have views of Swiftcurrent Lake or the surrounding mountain scenery. Facilities include the Ptarmigan Dining room, the Swiss Room Lounge and Interlaken Lounge, Heidi's Snack Shop, and Grizzly Track Traders Gift Shop. The hotel is a contributing property in the National Historic Landmark, Great Northern Railway Buildings district. Many Glacier Hotel is a member of Historic Hotels of America, the official program of the National Trust for Historic Preservation.[2] The main attractions in the area include hiking, boat rides or rentals, or simply enjoying the western environment that Many Glacier provides.

St. Mary River
The St. Mary River is a north-flowing tributary to the Oldman River in Alberta, itself a tributary of the South Saskatchewan River. The Saint Mary together with the Belly River and Waterton River drain a small portion of Montana, in the United States, to the Hudson Bay watershed in Canada. The river rises as a stream on Gunsight Mountain in Glacier National Park and flows into Gunsight Lake, then into Saint Mary Lake, exits the park and flows on into Lower St. Mary Lake in the Blackfeet Indian Reservation. From the reservation, the St. Mary River flows north into Alberta and the St. Mary Reservoir. It flows into the Oldman River which eventually reaches the Saskatchewan River.

Chief Mountain
Chief Mountain (also called "Old Chief Mountain") is located northwest of Babb on the border of Glacier National Park and the Blackfeet Indian Reservation. The mountain is one of the most prominent peaks and rock formations along the Rocky Mountain Front, a  overthrust fault, known as the Lewis Overthrust, which extends from central Montana into southern Alberta.

The Chief Mountain Border Station and Quarters is a customs/immigration station on the Canada–United States border in Glacier County, Montana. The station is named after Chief Mountain, described above. The station is located within the boundaries of Glacier National Park and is a notable example of the National Park Service Rustic style. It is listed on the National Register of Historic Places.

Geography
U.S. Route 89 passes through the community, leading north  to the Canadian border at Piegan and south  to St. Mary. Many Glacier Road leads west from Babb  to the border of Glacier National Park at the east end of Lake Sherburne and continues west  to the Many Glacier Hotel.

Demographics

History
Established in 1905 as a post office, the town of Babb was named for Cyrus C. Babb, the engineer in charge of surveying the U.S. Reclamation Service's St. Mary Irrigation Canal. The canal siphoned water from the St. Mary River into the Milk River and was one of the first Bureau of Reclamation projects in the nation.

Climate

References

External links
 Babb Elementary School

Census-designated places in Glacier County, Montana